Jamestown is an unincorporated community in Jefferson County, West Virginia, United States. Jamestown lies near the Clarke County, Virginia border on County Route 2 southwest of Summit Point.

References

Unincorporated communities in Jefferson County, West Virginia
Unincorporated communities in West Virginia